Aadya is a rare given name in southern India.There are versions like 'Aadya' or 'Aadhya'. Adya means first.
First power, first to inhabit or first to be at the beginning of the universe, it also means unparalleled.
The name Aadya or Adya originates from Sanskrit and is another name for Lord Shiva.

It is a gender neutral name as Shiva and Shakti is interchangeable.

In India, it's a given name for both boys and girls.

In Russian, it is a diminutive of the male first names Avdey and Avdiky.

It is shared by the following people:
Adya Rangacharya (1904–1984), Indian writer, actor, and scholar
Zaskia Adya Mecca (b. 1987), Indonesian actress

See also
Adya Houn'tò, a spirit associated with drumming in West African Vodun
Adyashanti, an American spiritual teacher

References

Notes

Sources
Н. А. Петровский (N. A. Petrovsky). "Словарь русских личных имён" (Dictionary of Russian First Names). ООО Издательство "АСТ". Москва, 2005. 

